The Debtors (Scotland) Act 1838 (1 & 2 Vict. c. 114), sometimes the Personal Diligence Act, was an Act of Parliament in the United Kingdom, signed into law on 16 August 1838. It amended the law of Scotland in matters relating to personal diligence - the ways in which the person or property of a debtor could be secured - arrestments and poindings (pronounced pindings). The effect was to simplify the form of proceedings and reduce their expense.

References

The British almanac of the Society for the Diffusion of Useful Knowledge, for the year 1839. The Society for the Diffusion of Useful Knowledge, London, 1839.

External links
 
 

1838 in Scotland
Acts of the Parliament of the United Kingdom concerning Scotland
United Kingdom Acts of Parliament 1838
Bankruptcy in Scotland
United Kingdom contract law